Leonardo Barnjak (born 31 January 1984) is a Croatian retired football striker who played primarily for TSV St. Johann in the Austrian Regional League West.

Managerial career
After finishing his career at German amateur side FC Hammerau, Barnjak returned to Austria to take the helm at Austria Salzburg Reserves.

References

External links

1984 births
Living people
People from Bugojno
Croats of Bosnia and Herzegovina
Bosnia and Herzegovina emigrants to Croatia
Association football forwards
Croatian footballers
NK Hrvatski Dragovoljac players
NK Zadar players
HNK Segesta players
NK Međimurje players
TSV St. Johann im Pongau players
SK Bischofshofen players
Croatian Football League players
Austrian Regionalliga players
Austrian Landesliga players
Austrian 2. Landesliga players
Croatian expatriate footballers
Expatriate footballers in Austria
Croatian expatriate sportspeople in Austria
Expatriate footballers in Germany
Croatian expatriate sportspeople in Germany